The Ruger XGI is a semi-automatic rifle chambered in .308 Winchester or .243 Winchester. The XGI's function and aesthetics are influenced by the Ruger Mini-14, only sized up to the larger, more powerful .308 and .243 calibers. Although it was advertised in 1984–1985, it never entered production due to unresolved mechanical and production issues.

See also
 Ruger Mini-14
 M14 rifle

References

External links
 "The Ruger XGI Rifle", S.W.A.T. Magazine, April 1985

7.62×51mm NATO semi-automatic rifles
XGI